The Joseph Fiery House is a historic home located at Clear Spring, Washington County, Maryland, United States. It is a 2-story, three-bay limestone Germanic central-chimney house, probably dating from the 1760s or 1770s, with a -story log addition. The house stands on a  tract with a small cluster of outbuildings. An unusual feature of the house is the absence of any openings at all on the rear elevation. Also on the property is a limestone Swisser style barn.

The Joseph Fiery House was listed on the National Register of Historic Places in 2002.

References

External links
, including photo in 2002, at Maryland Historical Trust

German-American culture in Maryland
Houses on the National Register of Historic Places in Maryland
Houses in Washington County, Maryland
Houses completed in 1760
Swiss-American culture in Maryland
National Register of Historic Places in Washington County, Maryland